Note: In 2012, the International Code of Zoological Nomenclature was amended, with new regulations allowing the publication of new names and nomenclatural acts in zoology after 2011, in works "produced in an edition containing simultaneously obtainable copies by a method that assures (...) widely accessible electronic copies with fixed content and layout", provided that the work is registered in ZooBank before it is published, the work itself states the date of publication with evidence that registration has occurred, and the ZooBank registration states both the name of an electronic archive intended to preserve the work and the ISSN or ISBN associated with the work. New scientific names appearing in electronic works are not required to be registered in ZooBank, only the works themselves are. Works containing descriptions of some of the taxa listed below were not printed on paper in 2012; however, the taxa that were described in works which were registered in ZooBank in 2012 are listed as valid.

Plants

Arthropods

The following is a summary of the arthropods described in 2012
41 arachnids
105 crustaceans
362 insects
5 merostomatans
51 trilobites
9 other arthropods

Bryozoans

Brachiopods

Molluscs

The following is a summary of the Molluscs described in 2012
 54 ammonites
 14 other cephalopods
 52 gastropods
 15 other molluscs

Echinoderms

Ascidians

Conodonts

Fishes

During 2012, 81 new species of fish were described.

Amphibians

Research
 A study of the braincase of Eocaecilia micropodia and a phylogenetic analysis of non-amniote tetrapods is published by Hillary C. Maddin, Farish A. Jenkins Jr and Jason S. Anderson (2012).
 A study of anatomy and relationships of Solenodonsaurus janenschi is published by Marylène Danto, Florian Witzmann and Johannes Müller (2012).
 A study of limb joint mobility of Ichthyostega is published by Stephanie E. Pierce, Jennifer A. Clack and John R. Hutchinson (2012).

New taxa

Newly named basal tetrapods

Newly named temnospondyls

Newly named lepospondyls

Newly named lissamphibians

Parareptiles

Newly named parareptiles

Ichthyopterygians

Newly named ichthyosaurs

Lepidosauromorphs

Newly named saurosphargids

Newly named sauropterygians

Newly named rhynchocephalians

Squamates

Research
 A large phylogenetic analysis of living and fossil squamates is published by Jacques A. Gauthier et al. (2012).
 A study of squamate diversity in North America during the latest Cretaceous (Maastrichtian) and the impact of Cretaceous–Paleogene extinction event on the diversity of the group is published by Nicholas R. Longrich, Bhart-Anjan S. Bhullar and Jacques A. Gauthier (2012).

New taxa

Turtles

Research
 A large phylogenetic analysis of basal turtles is published by Jérémy Anquetin (2012).

New taxa

Archosauromorphs

Newly named basal archosauromorphs

Archosaurs

The following is a summary of the archosaurs described in 2012
 8 pseudosuchians
 1 basal dinosauriform
 40 non-avian dinosaurs
 64 birds
 9 pterosaurs
 1 archosaur of uncertain phylogenetic placement

Synapsids

Non-mammalian synapsids

Research
 A phylogenetic analysis of basal synapsids is published by Roger B. J. Benson (2012).

New taxa

Mammals

The following is a summary of the mammals described in 2012
 9 non-eutherian Mammals
 24 eutherian Mammals

Other animals

Other organisms

References

 
2010s in paleontology
Paleontology